
Gmina Krzeszyce is a rural gmina (administrative district) in Sulęcin County, Lubusz Voivodeship, in western Poland.

Villages
Gmina Krzeszyce contains the villages and settlements of Brzozowa, Brzozówka, Czartów, Dębokierz, Dzierzążna, Jeziorki, Karkoszów, Kołczyn, Krasnołęg, Krępiny, Krzemów, Krzeszyce, Łąków, Łukomin, Malta, Marianki, Maszków, Muszkowo, Piskorzno, Przemysław, Rudna, Rudnica, Studzionka, Świętojańsko and Zaszczytowo.

Neighbouring gminas
Gmina Krzeszyce is bordered by the gminas of Bogdaniec, Deszczno, Lubniewice, Ośno Lubuskie, Słońsk, Sulęcin and Witnica.

Twin towns – sister cities

Gmina Krzeszyce is twinned with:
 Altlandsberg, Germany

References

Krzeszyce
Sulęcin County